New Lusaka Stadium was a planned multi-purpose stadium in Lusaka, Zambia until Zambia backed out of hosting the 2011 All-Africa Games in 2009.  It would have been used mostly for football matches and hosted some events for the 2011 All-Africa Games. The stadium would have had a capacity of 70,000 people.  It would have replaced the current large stadium in Lusaka, Independence Stadium.  It would have been built along with new stadiums in Ndola and Livingstone.

External links
Plans for new stadium announced
More plans for stadium

Football venues in Zambia
Proposed stadiums
Buildings and structures in Lusaka
Multi-purpose stadiums in Zambia
Proposed buildings and structures in Zambia